The inaugural edition of the Mutual of Omaha Duel in the Pool took place on April 6, 2003, at the Indiana University Natatorium on the campus of IUPUI in Indianapolis. The event pitted the United States' top swimmers against those of Australia.

The event featured 26 races — four relay events and 22 individual races — in an Olympic-sized pool. There were 270 total points up for grabs in the event, with the U.S. smashing Australia in the end 196-74.

The event was broadcast in the United States by the NBC television network, who taped the event, then showed it over two days the next weekend on April 12 and April 13, 2003. Ted Robinson handled stroke-by-stroke duties, with Rowdy Gaines as the analyst. Craig Hummer was the poolside reporter and interviewer.

Event summary
The Australian team had many noticeable absences:
Ian Thorpe withdrew due to a serious illness;
Jodie Henry withdrew due to terrorism fears, as this was one of the first major international sporting events held on the heels of the beginning of the war in Iraq;
other notable missing Aussies were Michael Klim, Petria Thomas, Geoff Huegill, Giaan Rooney, Leisel Jones, and Ashley Callus.

Of the 26 events held, the U.S. won 21.

Results
Events are listed in chronological order.

WR=World Record; USOR=U.S. Open Record; AR=American Record

Phelps' world record in the 400 IM, the only one set that day, earned him a $25,000 bonus.

Reasons for DQs:
Libby Lenton had originally placed first in the Women's 50 m Free, but was stripped of the win because the judges said she false-started. A videotape review of the start, though, appeared to show that she didn't false-start; however, because FINA does not allow tape reviews, the DQ stood, though a FINA Technical Committee member told Lenton her race time would stand as an Australian record.

Duel in the Pool
Mutual of Omaha Duel in the Pool
2003 in American sports